Chandra Prakash Shukla (born 5 July 1968) is an Indian politician and a member of 17th Legislative Assembly of Uttar Pradesh of India. He represents the Kaptanganj constituency of Uttar Pradesh and is a member of the Bharatiya Janata Party.

Early life and education
Shukla was born 5 July 1968 in Basti district of Uttar Pradesh to father Arjun Prasad Shukla. On 23 May 1986, he married Asha Shukla, with whom he has two daughters. He graduated as a Charted Accountant from Institute of Chartered Accountants of India, New Delhi in 1999. Apart from being a chartered accountant, he is the chairman of "Timecity Group".

Political career
Shukla has been a member of the 17th Legislative Assembly of Uttar Pradesh. Since 2017, he has represented the Kaptanganj constituency and is a member of the BJP. In 2017 elections, he defeated Bahujan Samaj Party candidate Ram Prasad Chaudhary by a margin of 6,827 votes.

Posts held

References

Uttar Pradesh MLAs 2017–2022
Bharatiya Janata Party politicians from Uttar Pradesh
Living people
People from Basti district
1968 births